Lewis Thomas Christmas (November 5, 1855 - June 27, 1928) was a reverend, teacher, school principal and state legislator in North Carolina. He represented Warren County, North Carolina in the North Carolina House of Representatives from 1879 to 1880.

Biography 

Christmas was born November 5, 1855 in Warren County.

He graduated from the Theological Department of Shaw University in 1884, the same department he would later teach at.    

Christmas was elected to represent Warren County, North Carolina in the North Carolina House of Representatives in August 1878. He served the county with fellow African-American Republican Hawkins Wesley Carter. In the 1879 session he served on the Counties, Cities, Towns and Townships and the Deaf and Dumb and the Blind Asylum committees and introduced a bill to provide compensation for people who had been wrongfully imprisoned.

He served as principal of the Wilmington Training School.

He was a Baptist and was a Reverend working as the pastor of the Central Baptist Church in Wilmington, North Carolina. He also served as State Missionary for the Negro State Baptist convention for many years. In 1920 he was awarded a Doctor of Divinity degree from the Florida Baptist College.

He authored a publication titled An Evil Router in 1900 which was a missionary pamphlet intended to "medicate moral derelicts".

He died June 27, 1928 at home in Raleigh, North Carolina and was survived by his wife and daughter as well as seven siblings.

See also
African-American officeholders during and following the Reconstruction era
Isaac Alston, state senator from Warren County in 1879

References

External links
Findagrave entry

Members of the North Carolina House of Representatives
People from Warren County, North Carolina
Shaw University alumni
African-American Baptist ministers

1855 births
1928 deaths